National Tertiary Route 409, or just Route 409 (or ) is a National Road Route of Costa Rica, located in the San José, Cartago provinces.

Description
In San José province the route covers Desamparados canton (San Antonio district).

In Cartago province the route covers La Unión canton (Tres Ríos, San Diego, Río Azul districts).

References

Highways in Costa Rica